The Department of Co-operation, Food and Consumer Protection of state of Tamil Nadu is one of the ministry of Government of Tamil Nadu

History 
 Tamil Nadu is the pioneer in the cooperative movement in India. The first agricultural  cooperative  credit society  was started at Thirur in Tiruvallur District  and a consumer  cooperative  society  was  started in Triplicane in 1904. The other States  had started cooperative societies following Tamil Nadu as a model.

Functions 
The functions of the  Department relate to policy formulation and decision making in the following subjects :
 Co-operative Credit. 
 Co-operative Marketing, Processing and Storage. 
 Consumer co-operatives. 
 Co-operative Education, Research and Training. 
 Special Types of Co-operatives. 
 Integrated Co-operative Development Project. 
 Co-operative Election. 
 Public Distribution System. 
 Enforcement of control orders under the Essential Commodities Act. 
 Consumer protection including price control measures.

Sub-departments

Undertakings and bodies

Present Ministers for Co-operation 
 I. Periyaswami

Former Ministers for Co-operation 
 2016- 2021
 Sellur Raju

Present Ministers for Food and Consumer Protection 
 R. Sakkarapani

Former Ministers for Food and Consumer Protection 
 2006 - 2011
 E. V. Velu

See also 
 Civil Supplies Department of Kerala
 Civil Supplies Department
 Government of Tamil Nadu
 Manu Needhi Consumer and Environmental Protection Centre
 Ministry of Consumer Affairs, Food and Public Distribution (India)
 Tamil Nadu Government's Departments

References

External links
  www.tn.gov.in/departments/cfcp.html (Official Website of the Tamil Nadu Co-operation, Food and Consumer Protection Department)
 www.consumer.tn.gov.in/ (Official Website of the Tamil Nadu Civil Supplies and Consumer Protection Department)
  www.tncu.tn.gov.in/ (Official Website of the Tamil Nadu Co-operation Department)
 (Official website of Government of Tamil Nadu)
  www.tn.gov.in/rti/proact_cfcp.htm ( RTI site of the Tamil Nadu Co-operation, Food and Consumer Protection Department

Tamil Nadu state government departments
State civil supplies departments of India
Consumer protection in India
Cooperatives in India